Sarapiquí is the name of the district number 14 of the canton of Alajuela, that in turn belongs to the province of Alajuela in Costa Rica.

Because it borders on the canton of Sarapiquí, it is often confused with the latter.

History 
Sarapiquí was created on 6 November 1922 by Decree 28.

Location 
The district of Sarapiquí, is located in the northern region of the country and borders the canton of Sarapiquí to the east, Río Cuarto to the northwest, Sarchí to the west, and the district of Sabanilla de Alajuela to the south.

Its head, the picturesque and rural village of San Miguel, is located 51 km (1 hour 30 minutes) north of the city of Alajuela and 67.9 km (1 hour 52 minutes) north of San José, the nation's capital .

The nearest towns to San Miguel are Río Cuarto (city), La Virgen de Sarapiquí (village) and Cariblanco (village).

Geography  
Sarapiquí has an area of 113.98 km², which makes it the largest district of the canton by area. and an elevation of 510 metres.

It presents a mountainous relief in the majority of its territory.

Demographics 

For the 2011 census, Sarapiquí had a population of  inhabitants.

Transportation

Road transportation 
The district is covered by the following road routes:
 National Route 126
 National Route 140

Settlements
The 11 population centers of the district are:

San Miguel (header)
Bajo Latas
Cariblanco
Cinchona
Corazón de Jesús
Isla Bonita
San Antonio
Paraíso
Punta Mala
Ujarrás
Virgen del Socorro (part)

Economy 

The economy is mainly based on agriculture and livestock.

In the town of San Miguel de Sarapiquí, financial and health services (Ebais) are offered, both state.

The trade is represented by stores selling groceries, among others.

See also 
 List of districts of Costa Rica

References 

Districts of Alajuela Province
Populated places in Alajuela Province